is a former Japanese football player and manager.

Playing career
Katsumata was born in Fujiyoshida on February 17, 1956. After graduating from Hosei University, he joined Kofu SC (later Ventforet Kofu) in 1978. He retired in 1984.

Coaching career
After retirement, Katsumata became a manager for Kofu SC in 1994. He resigned at the end of the season and Yuji Tsukada became the new manager in 1995. In 1999, the club joined the new J2 League, and Katsumata became a manager to replace Tsukada because Tsukada did not have a coaching license for the J2 League.

Managerial statistics

References

External links

1956 births
Living people
Hosei University alumni
Association football people from Yamanashi Prefecture
Japanese footballers
Japan Soccer League players
Ventforet Kofu players
Japanese football managers
J2 League managers
Ventforet Kofu managers
Association football forwards
Japanese sportsperson-politicians